Name : Mojammil Hoque

Father : Rejabul Momin

Mother : Niharan Bibi

DOB :01/02/1995

Episode list

Season 1

Season 2

Webisodes 
On the official website of Imortal, a series of five-minute webisodes of the show, entitled The Hidden Chapters of Imortal: Anino't Panaginip will be available for streaming.

Maestro
Lia
Conversation with Rizal
The Dream
Salesman
Hikers
Superhero
Darla
Memories 1
Memories 2
The Monologue
Mga Pangitain ni Jethro
Chance Encounter 1
Chance Encounter 2
Outbreak 1
Outbreak 2
Anghel 1
Anghel 2
Birthday
Lucille 1
Lucille 2
Urban Legend
Kalaro
Broken 
Rebirth 1
Rebirth 2

See also
List of programs broadcast by ABS-CBN

References

External links
 Imortal's story on ABS-CBN

Lists of soap opera episodes
Lists of Philippine drama television series episodes
Lists of fantasy television series episodes